The Karanga River is a river that passes through the Karanga Ward of the Kilimanjaro Region  of Tanzania. Its source is at the foot of Mount Kilimanjaro from which it flows southwards to the Nyumba ya Mungu Reservoir.

References

Rivers of Tanzania
Geography of Kilimanjaro Region